Louis James Pesha (August 11, 1868 – October 1, 1912) was a noted photographer of ships of the Great Lakes and early 20th century Michigan landmarks.  Pesha died in an accident while operating his steam-powered automobile.  He practiced his trade, owning the Pesha Postcard Company in Marine City, Michigan.  Today, his photos are of highly sought by collectors of Great Lake memorabilia.

Early life
Pesha was born on August 11, 1868 at Euphemia, Ontario, Canada.  He worked in farming in the Euphemia area until about 1895, when he learned the photography trade.  For the next six years, he had studios in Oil Springs, Inwood, Alvinston and Brigden, Ontario.

His studio
In 1901, Pesha moved to the United States and settled in Marine City, Michigan.  He opened a photography studio known as various variations of "The Pesha Postcard Company."

His primary focus was on photographing commercial ships as they passed in front of his studio, on the Saint Clair River.  He also traveled around the Great Lakes Basin, photographing railroad stations and buildings in villages, towns, and cities in the United States and his native Canada.  He would later print his photographs as postcards, selling them to stores and in classified ads in journals and magazines for the public to buy and use.

Pesha was also known for his trick photography. These postcards depicted impossible scenes and played on popular subjects of the time such as flight.

Following Pesha's death in 1912, his widow continued the business, in Marine City, until about 1920. She later moved the business to Detroit, but photopostcards passed out of fashion in the 1920s. The vast majority of his glass negatives were then destroyed.

His death
In 1910, Pesha purchased a White Motor Company steam-powered automobile.  This was then considered the top of luxury steam cars and was the only one registered in Marine City.  On October 1, 1912, while visiting his parents' farm in Euphemia, Ontario, he died when his car overturned and his skull was fractured.  He is buried in a family plot in Shetland, Ontario.

Family
On August 29, 1892, Pesha married Lena E. Fancher of Santena, IL. They had one child, born in 1901, Lorraine Pesha.

References
Buel, Gene and Scott Buel. Images of America: Marine City. Charleston, SC : Arcadia Pub., 2012.

Marine City Community Pride and Heritage Museum

American photographers
Postcard artists
1868 births
1912 deaths
People from Lambton County
People from Marine City, Michigan